Thado Nalo is a stream that passes through the city of Karachi, Sindh, Pakistan from northeast to the south and drains into the Malir River which empties into Arabian Sea.

See also
 Malir Town
 Malir River
 Sona Nala
 Gogni Nala

References 

Rivers of Karachi